Andrian is a male given name and a German surname. It may refer to the following people:
Given name
Andrian Bogdan (born 1976), Moldovan football coach and former goalkeeper
Andrian Candu (born 1975), Moldovan politician, criminal
Andrian Cucovei (born 1982), Moldovan football defender
Andrian Dushev (born 1970), Bulgarian sprint canoer
Andrian Kordon (born 1977), Israeli judoka
Andrian Mardare (born 1995), Moldovan javelin thrower
Andrian Negai (born 1985), Moldovan footballer
Andrian Mardiansyah (born 1978), Indonesian football player and manager 
Andriyan Nikolayev (1929–2004), Soviet cosmonaut
Andrian Zbîrnea (born 1990), Moldovan weightlifter

Surname
Leopold Andrian (1875–1951), Austrian author
Victor Franz von Andrian-Werburg (1813–1858), Austrian politician
Ulrich von Andrian, German immunologist

See also
Adrian

German-language surnames